Greenup County High School (GCHS) is a public high school in Lloyd, Kentucky, an unincorporated area just outside the city of Greenup, the county seat of Greenup County in the northeastern part of the U.S. state of Kentucky. Their mascot is the Musketeers, and their colors are green, black, and gold.

History
Greenup County High School was officially dedicated in 1972. It was built by Foson Construction Company out of Ashland, Kentucky. The school contains four grades, 9–12. It was formed when McKell High School, Greenup High School, and Wurtland High School were closed. That is the explanation for the school mascot, Musketeer, and motto, All For One, and One For All.
In the Spring of 2007, the Greenup County Board of Education approved the 8 million dollar renovation of the high school. It was constructed by J and H Reinforcing and Structural Erectors from Portsmouth, Ohio. Phases 1 and 2 consisted of The renovations to the upstairs and downstairs of the current building. Phase 3 consisted of new HVAC units for the building. In the Spring of 2010, construction of two special education classrooms was approved by the Kentucky Department of Education and the Greenup County Board of Education. All construction work is now complete.

Sports

Miscellaneous

 Home of the 1977 Kentucky 4A state football champions.
 Home of the 16-time UCA National Champions. (Competitive Cheerleading)
 Home of the 14-time competitive dance team National Champions.

References
Greenup County High School Website

Notes

External links
  Greenup County Schools
 Greenup County High School Website

Schools in Greenup County, Kentucky
Public high schools in Kentucky